Singapore participated at the 2021 Southeast Asian Games held in Hanoi, Vietnam from 12 May to 23 May 2022. The Games were postponed in 2021 due to the Covid-19 pandemic.

At the end of the Games, Singapore top the Medal Tally for Bowling, Fencing and Swimming. There were also 5 Games Records, 16 National Records and 41 Personal Best.  62 of the 164 medals were won by debutants.

During the closing ceremony, swimmer Quah Jing Wen was named as one of the MVP of the Games with 6 Gold and 1 Bronze medals.

Competitors
Singapore sent a total of 424 athletes competing in 33 of 40 sports, half, or 243 of them making their Games debut. No athletes were fielded in Bodybuilding, Futsal, Kurash, Petanque, Sepak Takraw, Vovinam and Weightlifting.

Medal summary

Medallists

| style="text-align:left; vertical-align:top;"|

Results

Archery 

 Compound

Athletics 

 Men
 Track and road events

Women
 Track and road events

Field events

Badminton

 
Men

 
Women

 
Mixed

Basketball

5x5 Basketball

Men's tournament

Women's tournament

5x5 Basketball

Men's tournament

Women's tournament

Chess

Men

Women

References

Southeast Asian Games
2021
Nations at the 2021 Southeast Asian Games